Poor Little Rich Girl: The Barbara Hutton Story is a 1987 television biographical drama starring Farrah Fawcett. The film chronicles the life of Barbara Hutton, a wealthy but troubled American socialite. Released as both a television film and a miniseries, the film won a Golden Globe Award for Best Miniseries or Television Film. Fawcett earned her fifth Golden Globe Award nomination, for Best Actress in a Miniseries of Television Film. Poor Little Rich Girl: The Barbara Hutton Story was based on C. David Heymann's Poor Little Rich Girl: The Life and Legend of Barbara Hutton.

Plot
The true story of one of the richest women in America, heiress to the Woolworth fortune, who had vast wealth and seven husbands.

Cast
 Farrah Fawcett as Barbara Hutton (Adult)
Matilda Johansson as Barbara (Age 5)
 Fairuza Balk as Barbara (Age 12)
 David Ackroyd as Graham Mattison
 Stéphane Audran as Pauline de la Rochelle
 Amadeus August as Court Haugwitz-Hardenberg Reventlow
 Nicholas Clay as Prince Alexis Mdivani
 Bruce Davison as Jimmy Donahue (Adult)
John Lindros as Jimmy Donahue (Age 11)
 Carmen Du Sautoy as Roussie
 Anne Francis as Marjorie Merriweather Post
 Sascha Hehn as Baron Gottfried von Cramm
 Kevin McCarthy as Franklyn Laws Hutton
 Tony Peck as James Douglas III
 Zoë Wanamaker as Jean Kennerly
 Clive Arrindell as Prince Igor Troubetzkoy
 Linden Ashby as Lance Reventlow (Adult)
Robert Holman as Lance (Ages 5–7)
 Jonathan Brandis as Lance (Age 11)
 Debbie Barker as Jill St. John
 Brenda Blethyn as Tiki Tocquet
 Nigel Le Vaillant as David Herbert
 Miriam Margolyes as Elsa Maxwell
 Carolyn Seymour as Dorothy Cadwell Taylor Dentice di Frasso
 Tracy Brooks Swope as Peggy
 Burl Ives as F.W. Woolworth
 James Read as Cary Grant
 Michael Shannon as Morley Kennerly
 Jana Shelden as Irene Olive Curley Bodde Hutton Moffett
 Toria Fuller as Edna Woolworth Hutton
 Blain Fairman as James P. Donahue
 Susan McDonald as Nurse
 Patricia Northcott as Jessie May Woolworth Donahue
 Liza Ross as Aunt Grace
 Nancy Gair as Louise Astor Van Alen
 Julie Eccles as Doris Duke
 David Gilliam as Phil Plant
 Peter Scranton as Jack Pauling
 John Golightly as Inspector Clair
 Julie Ronnie as Sally
 Ronald Leigh-Hunt as Raymond Needham
 James Woolley as Clifford Turner
 Vernon Dobtcheff as Jules Glaenzer
 Nicholas Le Prevost as Sir Patrick Hastings
 Tim Bannerman as Norman Birkett
 Sneh Gupta as Moharoni
 Ellen Garber as Woman friend
 Jeremy Anthony as Maurice Doan
 Neville Jason as Raymond Doan
 Kenny Baker as Burlesque Artist (Uncredited)
 Winston Churchill as Himself (Archival footage) (Uncredited)
 Adolf Hitler as Himself (Archival footage) (Uncredited)
 Queen Elizabeth II as Herself (Archival footage) (Uncredited)
 Queen Elizabeth The Queen Mother as Herself (Archival footage) (Uncredited)

Crew
Written by: Dennis Turner
Directed by: Charles Jarrott
Producer: Nick Gillott
Music: Richard Rodney Bennett

Reception

Critical response
Film critic and journalist John J. O'Connor of The New York Times wrote in his review: "This television portrait gives us a Barbara Hutton who is shy and decidedly uncertain of herself. For the most part, she is the victim of scavengers. [...] Actually, according to Mr. Heymann's book, Miss Hutton was more forward and adventurous than is indicated here by the script constraints put on Ms. Fawcett. She may have been shy but she wasted no time in pouncing on any object or person that caught her fancy." Television critic and journalist Jeff Jarvis wrote in his review: "What the stock market did to itself on Bloody Monday, Farrah Fawcett does to herself here. Her value as an actress soared after The Burning Bed and Extremities. Now comes the crash in Poor Little Rich Girl, a two-night miniseries of miseries about Woolworth heiress Barbara Hutton. [...] Fawcett should have more faith in her talent. If she keeps making herself look awful when she acts, she’s going to be left with only one part to play: Godzilla."

Awards
 45th Golden Globe Awards
 Best Miniseries or Television Film (won)
 Best Actress in a Miniseries or Television Film (Farrah Fawcett) (nominated)
 40th Primetime Emmy Awards
 Outstanding Costume Design for a Miniseries or a Special (won)
 Outstanding Hairstyling for a Miniseries or Special (won)
 Outstanding Makeup for a Miniseries or Special (won)

Release
Poor Little Rich Girl: The Barbara Hutton Story aired on NBC on November 16, 1987. The film was released on DVD on December 16, 2008, by A+E Networks Home Entertainment.

References

Citations

Sources

External links
 
 
 
 

1987 drama films
1987 films
American biographical drama films
1980s American television miniseries
Cultural depictions of American women
Films based on biographies
F. W. Woolworth Company
Films directed by Charles Jarrott
Films scored by Richard Rodney Bennett
NBC network original films
Best Miniseries or Television Movie Golden Globe winners
1980s English-language films
American drama television films
1980s American films